Oregon Route 7 is an Oregon state highway which runs from Interstate 84 at Baker City to U.S. Route 26 at Austin Junction.  OR 7 traverses several highways of the Oregon state highway system: Whitney Highway No. 71, part of the La Grande–Baker Highway No. 66, and part of the Baker–Copperfield Highway No 12.  A short spur, Oregon Route 410, serves the city of Sumpter.

Route description
OR 7 has its southern terminus at a junction with U.S. Route 26 at the unincorporated locale of Austin Junction. From Austin Junction, it runs roughly northeast, passing near Bates and Austin, and crossing the Middle Fork John Day River. The route continues northeast through the Malheur National Forest until it crosses the North Fork Burnt River and passes into the Wallowa–Whitman National Forest. The road follows the river roughly eastward until it reaches the community of Whitney, where it turns northeast again. South of Sumpter the route crosses the Powder River—in an area covered with gold dredge tailings—and forms a junction with Oregon Route 410. OR 7 continues southeast along the Powder River and passes Phillips Lake, an impoundment of the river dating from 1968. At its junction with Oregon Route 245 at Salisbury, the route veers north as it continues to follow the river, terminating in Baker City at an interchange with I-84.

History
The route of Oregon Route 7 once followed the current route of Oregon Route 245 to Unity, but it was changed in favor of the Sumpter routing.

Major intersections

References

007
Transportation in Baker County, Oregon
Transportation in Grant County, Oregon